Stayko Stoychev (born 30 August 1989 in Chirpan) is a Bulgarian football player, currently playing for  Calisia Kalisz as a midfielder.

Career 
He was raised in Lokomotiv Plovdiv's youth teams and made his competitive debut for Lokomotiv in a match against Beroe Stara Zagora on 1 April 2007. He played for 14 minutes. The result of the match was a 5:0 win for Loko. He played than in the following years for PFC Brestnik 1948, PFC Chavdar Byala Slatina, Kom-Minyor, FK Chirpan and OFC Sliven 200. On 16 January 2012 he left Bulgaria and signed with Polish II. Liga club KP Calisia Kalisz. He played with the club until Mai 2012 and was after an brutal kick suspended by his club Calisia Kalisiz for a half year. Stoychev was than in March 2013 reprieved by Kalisz and joined until the end of the season, on loan to IV liga club KS Opatówek.

Notes 

1989 births
Living people
Bulgarian footballers
First Professional Football League (Bulgaria) players
Bulgarian expatriate sportspeople in Poland
OFC Sliven 2000 players
Bulgarian expatriate footballers
PFC Lokomotiv Plovdiv players
Expatriate footballers in Poland

Association football midfielders
People from Chirpan